Nicole Brewer (born April 15, 1983) is an American news reporter. She is a former Miss Pennsylvania from Philadelphia, Pennsylvania.

Early life, beauty pageant contestant and education 
Brewer was born in Philadelphia, Pennsylvania. As a junior and senior in college, Nicole Brewer won two local pageant titles, including Miss Central Pennsylvania 2004, and Miss Allegheny Valley 2005. In her second attempt at the state title, she won the Miss Pennsylvania 2005 title on July 2, 2005, in Nazareth, Pennsylvania. On January 21, 2006, Brewer competed in the nationally televised Miss America pageant, making it into the top ten final contestants, getting beat out by eventual winner Jennifer Berry of Oklahoma.

Brewer graduated from Marple Newtown Senior High School,  in 2001 and Millersville University of Pennsylvania in 2005, graduating with a B.S Magna cum laude in speech communications. During her college years, Brewer was president of the National Broadcasting Society.  She also served as business manager for the university cable station.

Career
Brewer interned at WGAL-TV in Lancaster, Pennsylvania and worked as a special assignment reporter for a community access cable television station in Greeley, Colorado. She joined CBS 3’s Eyewitness News team on April 1, 2008 as the first local TV reporter who was reporting primarily for a website, CBS3.com, and as a contributor to Wake Up News on The CW Philly. Before joining CBS 3, Brewer had been a feature reporter and producer for the nightly news magazine Tempo at WLVT-TV, the PBS station in Bethlehem, Pennsylvania. She won a 2008 Mid-Atlantic Emmy Award for her feature report for the Tempo episode "Kids and Gangs". She was also nominated by the Associated Press in 2009 for her feature, "Parents on Facebook". She has been a volunteer for the Big Brothers Big Sisters of America organization.

Brewer then became anchor for the weekend morning newscasts on CBS 3 and was weekday reporter for the station's morning shows. In June, 2018, after a decade on air, she left her job at the station saying she wanted to spend more time with her family.

References

External links
 
 
CBS 3's Nicole Brewer
Miss Pennsylvania official website
CBS 3 Eyewitness News

Television personalities from Philadelphia
Living people
Miss America 2006 delegates
1983 births